Drew Sanders Beam (born February 14, 2003) is an American college baseball pitcher for the Tennessee Volunteers.

Amateur career
Beam grew up in Murfreesboro, Tennessee and attended Blackman High School, where he played football and baseball. He had a record of 8–1 and a 0.37 ERA as a sophomore. Beam committed to play college baseball at Tennessee shortly before the beginning of his junior year of high school. His junior season was canceled due to COVID-19. Beam missed his senior baseball season due to injury.

Beam was named to Tennessee's starting rotation entering his freshman season. He was named the Southeastern Conference (SEC) Pitcher of the Week and Freshman of the Week after throwing a complete-game shutout against fifth-ranked Vanderbilt on April 3, 2022. Beam was named the SEC Freshman of the Year and second team All-Conference at the end of the season.

References

External links

Tennessee Volunteers bio

Living people
Baseball players from Tennessee
Baseball pitchers
Tennessee Volunteers baseball players
2003 births